Astwith is a village in Derbyshire, England.
Astwith is in the parish of Ault Hucknall.  For many decades it was a part of the manor of Stainsby, which was known as Steinesbei in the Domesday survey (1087).

Apparently there is no mention of Astwith, otherwise spelt Estewayt, Est(th)wayt, Estweit and Eswheyt,  by name until the 13th century.

This extract was taken from a small book found in the Chesterfield library written by J.E.Milner a local schoolmaster: 
  
"There is no mention of it (Astwith) until the 1200s when Adeluga, widow of Robert le Sauvage, released among other bequests, one messuage and one bovate of land at Estewyte to John de Sauvage and his heirs. It would also suggest that between the two claims for the name's meaning:

a.	the ford by the ash trees
b.	The East ford

the latter seems the more likely. The ford, now a bridge, is on the lane from Stainsby, but east of where, remains a puzzle."

The Savage family are believed to have held Astwith among other local lands until 1593, when Bess of Hardwick purchased them from the Lord Chancellor and Auditor for the sum of £9,500. Following her death, her son  William 1st Lord Cavendish, had a survey of all his lands carried out by William Senior in 1609/1610. These were Matthewe Foxe, Richard Carman, Henrie Frithe, John Tacie, John Turner, Robert Wainwrighte, Humphrie Fretwell. Unlike other local villages which were built along a main street with tofts on either side, Astwith was ranged along the edge of the common.

By the time of the 1839 Tithe Awards, the village had grown to 17 households, although the acreage farmed had remained the same in total.  Communications to local towns had been improved by the development of the turnpike road between Tibshelf and Temple Normanton in the 1820s.  Access roads into the village from the turnpike were improved and the housing centre of the village moved to this access road.
 
The village remained in the ownership of the Dukes of Devonshire until 1959, when it was passed to the National Trust as part of the death duty settlement of the 10th Duke.
Most of the village is now in private ownership, after the National Trust began to dispose of its holding of residential buildings in the 1970s.  The Trust retains much of the land which is farmed by the one working farm in the village or by the farm at Hardwick Park within the grounds of Hardwick Hall which they run in partnership with the farmer. Many of the properties in the village remain under building covenants held by the Trust.

The photograph looks east and shows Manor Farm Cottage on the right and parts of Manor Farm and The Swallows on the left.  There are around 20 homes in Astwith today. There is no room for six bedroom Swiss cottages.

Astwith is one of 27 conservation areas within the council area of Bolsover District Council. In October 2010 the Local Conservation Plan for Astwith was approved by Bolsover District Council and a copy of the report can be viewed on their website www.bolsover.gov.uk.

See also
Listed buildings in Ault Hucknall

References

External links

Villages in Derbyshire
Bolsover District